The Gross Covered Bridge is  Burr Arch truss covered bridge in the census-designated place of Beaver Springs, Spring Township in Snyder County, Pennsylvania. It was listed on the National Register of Historic Places on August 29, 1997 and was documented by the Historic American Engineering Record (HAER) in 1981.

History 
The covered bridge was built in 1871 and originally spanned Middle Creek north of Beaver Springs on Township Route 574. It was moved in 1982 to its present location on Township Route 427 in Beaver Springs, spanning a run-off channel that flows into Middle Creek. The bridge was moved when a dam and resulting reservoir were created on the stream originally spanned by the bridge.

See also 
 List of bridges documented by the Historic American Engineering Record in Pennsylvania
 List of bridges on the National Register of Historic Places in Pennsylvania
 National Register of Historic Places listings in Snyder County, Pennsylvania

References

External links 

Bridges completed in 1871
Historic American Engineering Record in Pennsylvania
Covered bridges on the National Register of Historic Places in Pennsylvania
Covered bridges in Snyder County, Pennsylvania
Bridges in Snyder County, Pennsylvania
Tourist attractions in Snyder County, Pennsylvania
Wooden bridges in Pennsylvania
National Register of Historic Places in Snyder County, Pennsylvania
Road bridges on the National Register of Historic Places in Pennsylvania
Burr Truss bridges in the United States